Emanuela Setti Carraro (9 October 1950 in Borgosesia – 3 September 1982 in Palermo) was an Italian nurse, and wife of General Carlo Alberto dalla Chiesa. Less than two months after the marriage, she was the victim of a Sicilian Mafia AK-47 attack that also killed her husband and the escorting officer, Domenico Russo.

Life
She was born in Borgosesia, in the province of Vercelli, Piedmont, in 1950 by a family of the Milanese "good bourgeoisie". 
Emanuela followed her maternal engagement and graduated as a volunteer nurse of the Italian Red Cross. She paid special service at the Military Hospital in Milan and the operating rooms of the Institute of Surgical Pathology of the University of Milan. She had two brothers, the physician Paolo Giuseppe and the art dealer Giovanni Maria.
She became the wife of the general of carabinieri and Prefect of Palermo Carlo Alberto dalla Chiesa (who was widower since 1978) on July 10, 1982, after many hesitancies of dalla Chiesa due to the age gap (30 years), and only overcome thanks the determination of Emanuela. The wedding was celebrated privately in a small church in Ivano-Fracena in Trentino.
In the few months that she spent in Palermo, she was the only person that the prefect general had at his side.

Death
On 3 September 1982, at 9:15 pm, Emanuela was driving her Autobianchi A112 with her husband alongside her. Their bodies were found riddled by shots, with the general who embraced her as in an attempt to protect her with his own body; according to reconstruction, she was the first to be struck by the assassins headed by Pino Greco. After shooting with an AK-47, the killers shot her head with a pistol.
Although she was not the first woman victim of the Mafia at the time, her death triggered many reflections on the evolution of mafia practice, which had abandoned the "honorable" rule of not killing women.
She is buried with her husband in Parma.
The A112 is preserved in the historic museum of Voghera.

Legacy
She was honored with the Medaglia d'oro al merito della Croce Rossa Italiana (Gold Medal of Merit from the Italian Red Cross) and Medaglia al merito della sanità pubblica (Public Health Medal of Merit).
Many schools and health facilities all over Italy have been named after her.

References

1950 births
1982 deaths
People from Borgosesia
Italian nurses
Italian women nurses
People murdered by the Sicilian Mafia
20th-century Italian women
People murdered by the Corleonesi